Vol or Vols may refer to:
 Vol (command), a computer operating system command
 Vol (heraldry), a heraldic charge
 Volatility (finance)
 Volume (disambiguation)
 Volunteer (Irish republican)
 Nashville Vols, an American minor league baseball team
 Tennessee Volunteers, the sports teams of the University of Tennessee
 Republic of Upper Volta, a country in Africa now called Burkina Faso
 Vigilantes of Love, an American rock band
 Volans, a constellation
 Volapük, a constructed international auxiliary language
 Volunteer State Community College, a community college in Gallatin, Tennessee
 Vol, Iran, a village in Kurdistan Province, Iran
 Vol Dooley (1927-2014), former sheriff of Bossier Parish, Louisiana
 "Vol", a 2021 song by Merel Baldé

See also 
 Völs (disambiguation)